The Coltejer Building is the tallest building in Medellín, Colombia and the tenth-tallest in Colombia (as of 2016). It was completed in 1972. Coltejer is one of the most important textile companies in Colombia, and the largest textile complex in Latin America. It was founded in Medellín by Alejandro Echavarría on October 22, 1907.

Building history
Colombia began a skyscraper building era in the 1960s in Medellín. The Coltejer Building was designed by architects Raúl Fajardo, Aníbal Saldarriaga, Germán Samper, and Jorge Manjarres. Its construction required the demolition of the art nouveau Edificio Gonzalo Mejía which contained the Junín Theatre and the Hotel Europa.

It is said to resemble a sewing machine needle, representing the textile company after which it is named.

Statistics
Height: 175 metres
Area: 42,000 square metres.
Floors: 36
Parking spaces: 150
Elevators: 11

The Coltejer Building can host 40,000 seated people and 168,000 standing people.

Coltejer

History
The Echavarría family were the founders of two textile companies, Coltejer and Fabricato, and were also involved in coffee exportation and importation of other goods. In 1907, Alejandro Echavarría decided to import four power looms, which he put to work along with twelve workers in the patio of his coffee-processing plant. This was the beginning of Coltejer.

During the Depression era, Coltejer bought discarded looms cheaply from the United States that were brought in on muleback. During World War II, Coltejer was operating some 70,000 spindles and 1,900 looms, employing 4,000 workers in its Medellin plant in addition to those at Envigado.

Production
Coltejer's profits increased by a factor of twenty between 1940 and 1949, from 830,000 pesos to 16,520,000.

Coltejer has a total fabric production capacity of about 60 million metres, of which 90% is used to produce clothing and 10% is to make home textiles. It is also one of the leading denim producers in Colombia. Coltejer works with 67 exclusive distributors and 77 wholesalers in Colombia.

See also 
 List of tallest buildings in South America
 List of tallest buildings in Colombia

References 

Buildings and structures in Medellín
Skyscraper office buildings in Colombia
Office buildings completed in 1972